Rostock-Kassebohm station is a railway station in the town of Rostock, Mecklenburg-Vorpommern, Germany.

References

Kassebohm
Railway stations in Germany opened in 1988